Area code 907 is a telephone area code in the North American Numbering Plan (NANP) for the U.S. state of Alaska, except for the small southeastern community of Hyder, which uses area codes 236, 250, and 778 of neighboring Stewart, British Columbia.

Despite having telephone service to the contiguous US via a terrestrial line via the town of Juneau since 1937, Alaska was not assigned an area code until after the Alaska submarine cable was opened for traffic in 1956. The Alaska numbering plan area (NPA) was assigned the area code 907 and entered service in 1957.

The Alaska numbering plan area is geographically the largest of any in the United States. It is the second-largest in the NANP, and on the entire North American continent behind 867, which serves Canada's northern territories. Because the Aleutian Islands of Alaska cross longitude 180, the Anti-Meridian, 907 may be considered to be both the farthest west and the farthest east of all area codes in the NANP. Due to Alaska's low population, 907 is one of only twelve remaining area codes serving an entire state. It is not projected to be exhausted until after 2049.

Prior to October 2021, area code 907 had telephone numbers assigned for the central office code 988. In 2020, 988 was designated nationwide as a dialing code for the National Suicide Prevention Lifeline, which created a conflict for exchanges that permit seven-digit dialing. This area code was therefore scheduled to transition to ten-digit dialing by October 24, 2021.

Central office prefixes 
Note: Dashes in the "Introduced" box indicate the prefix was in use before February 4, 1994. Prefix 976 is assigned to Anchorage, and requires dialling "1+907" first.

See also
 List of NANP area codes

References

External links

 List of exchanges from AreaCodeDownload.com, 907 Area Code

Telecommunications-related introductions in 1957
907
907